Oechalia or Oichalia was a town of ancient Arcadia mentioned by Stephanus of Byzantium.

Its site is unlocated.

References

Populated places in ancient Arcadia
Former populated places in Greece
Lost ancient cities and towns